As of September 2016, the International Union for Conservation of Nature (IUCN) lists 116 extinct species, 132 possibly extinct species, 35 extinct in the wild species, 13 possibly extinct in the wild species, five extinct subspecies, one extinct in the wild subspecies, and four extinct varieties of plant.

Algae

Extinct species:
Vanvoorstia bennettiana, Bennett's seaweed
Possibly extinct species:
Galaxaura barbata
Phycodrina elegans

Bryophytes

There are three bryophyte extinct species evaluated by the IUCN.

Mosses

Extinct species:
Flabellidium spinosum
Neomacounia nitida

Pteridophytes

Extinct species:
Adiantum lianxianense
Dryopteris ascensionis
Possibly extinct species:

Extinct in the wild species
Diplazium laffanianum, Governor Laffan's fern

Gymnosperms

Possibly extinct species:

Extinct in the wild species:

Dicotyledons

Extinct species:

Possibly extinct species:

Extinct in the wild species:

Possibly extinct in the wild species:

Extinct subspecies:

Extinct in the wild subspecies:
Cyanea superba subsp. superba
Extinct varieties:

Monocotyledons

Extinct species:

Possibly extinct species:

Extinct in the wild species:

Possibly extinct in the wild species:
Costus vinosus
Extinct varieties
Cenchrus agrimonioides var. laysanensis

See also 
 List of least concern plants
 List of near threatened plants
 List of vulnerable plants
 List of endangered plants
 List of critically endangered plants
 List of data deficient plants

References 

.Recently
 
Invertebrates